Tarahiki Island, also known as Shag Island, is a  island in the Hauraki Gulf of New Zealand. It is well known for its breeding colony of up to 700 spotted shags.

See also

 List of islands of New Zealand
 List of islands
 Desert island

References

External links 
 Tarahiki Island (Shag Island) on NZ Topo Map

Uninhabited islands of New Zealand
Islands of the Hauraki Gulf
Islands of the Auckland Region